Alexis Curvers (24 February 1906, Liège – 7 February 1992) was a French-speaking Belgian writer. He was married to hellenist Marie Delcourt.

Biography 

Alexis Curvers' mother died when he was three years old and his father when he was nineteen. He followed the courses of Marie Delcourt at the University of Liège. Appointed a professor of rhetoric at Alexandria, he returned to Liege where he married Marie Delcourt. In 1933 he published an article entitled De l'objection de conscience which led him to be excluded from teaching. In 1940, he took refuge in the south of France, where he met other writers at Mme Mayrisch, before he returned to Liège. In 1957, his novel Tempo di Roma, rejected by Éditions Gallimard but published by Éditions Robert Laffont thanks to Marie de Vivier (pen name of Marie Jacquart, writer from Belgium) achieved great success.

Tempo di Roma obtained the Prix Sainte-Beuve in 1957 and was adapted to the cinema by Denys de La Patellière in 1963 under the same title: . In 1960, Alexis Curvers received the prix littéraire Prince-Pierre-de-Monaco for all his work.

Works

Novels 
1937: Bourg-le-Rond, Paris, Gallimard, (with Jean Sarrazin, Jean Hubaux's pen name)
1939: Printemps chez des ombres, Paris, Gallimard, (prix Auguste-Beernaert)
1957: Tempo di Roma, Paris, Robert Laffont

Short stories 
1942: La Famille Passager, études et contes, Brussels, Libris, 1942. (Coll. Le balancier, 8).
1958: Mercredi des cendres, in Vingt nouvelles belges, Verviers, Marabout, 1958. (Coll. Melio) p. 66 sqq.
1955: Entre deux anges, chroniques et nouvelles, Brussels, Audace et le Rond-Point, 1955.
1967: Jean ou le monastère des deux saints Jean, in Prénoms (Paris, Plon, 1967)
1937: Le Ruban chinois in Reflets, Brussels, Noël
1954: Le Massacre des innocents et Le ruban chinois, Paris, Les belles lectures

Poetry 
 Cahier de poésie (1922-1949), typography François Bernouard, Paris, 1949.
 La Flûte enchantée, Cahiers d'art poétique, published in Liège from 1953 to 1962.

Theatre 
 Ce vieil Œdipe, four-act satirical drama, prose and verse, after Sophocles, Brussels, De Visscher, 1947. (Coll. du Rideau de Bruxelles).

Essais and critics 
 De l'objection de conscience, état de la question, le Flambeau, June 1933 and Brussels, Finacom, 1933.
 Sur la réforme de l'orthographe et la pédagogie nouvelle, réflexions d'un observateur, in "Bulletin de l'Académie Royale de Langue et de Littérature Françaises de Belgique", 1954. Reproduit dans le Bulletin de l'Association des Classiques de l'Université de Liège, nE2, 1954, p. 8-22.
 Pie XII, le pape outragé, Paris, Laffont, 1964. (Second edition revised and expanded: Pie XII, le pape outragé; Bonne nuit très saint Père; petite histoire anecdotique de ce livre, s.l., Dominique Martin Morin, 1988.)
 La théologie secrète de la prétendue Adoration de l'Agneau, in "Approches de l'Art", mélanges d'esthétique et de sciences de l'Art presented to Arsène Soreil, Brussels, Renaissance du Livre, 1973.
 Une clef architecturale de l'Agneau mystique des frères Van Eyck, in "Il était douze fois Liège", Liège, Mardaga, 1980.
, by Alexis Curvers and Marie Curvers-Delcourt, Antwerp, De Sikkel, s.d. (monographs on Belgian art, 5th série, nE7).
Entretien Georges Moucheron - Alexis Curvers, Mons, R.T.B.F., centre de production du Hainaut, s.d.

Collaborations 
 Alexis Curvers collabiorated with the magazines Les cahiers mosans, Le courrier des poètes, La gaillarde, Revue Générale Belge, Marginales, Raf, Savoir et beauté, Le flambeau, Synthèses, Empreintes, Cahiers du Nord, Itinéraires, Lecture et tradition...

References

Bibliography 
 
 Alexis Curvers, l'homme et l'œuvre, n° spécial de la revue Ouvertures, 1981
 S. et N. De Winter, "Alexis Curvers", in André Malraux, Alexis Curvers, Francis Ponge, Brussels, Hatier, Auteurs contemporains, 1986, p. 45-67.
 "Alexis Curvers, pour son 80ème anniversaire", Itinéraires, n° 306, sept.-oct. 1986.
 Marie de Vivier, "Alexis Curvers", Le Thyrse, n°59, 1957.

External links 
 Alexis Curvers on Babelio
 “Tempo di Roma”, d’Alexis Curvers, présenté par Christian Libens (video)
 Alexis Curvers on Culture, Université de Liège
 Catherine Gravet, Alexis Curvers, Journal (1924-1961) on OpenEdition
 Cent Wallons du siècle

University of Liège alumni
Belgian writers in French
Walloon people
Prix Sainte-Beuve winners
1906 births
1992 deaths
Writers from Liège
Members of the Académie royale de langue et de littérature françaises de Belgique